Bagh Daraq (also Romanized as Bāgh Daraq and Bāghdaraq; also known as Bagdere, Bāgh Darreh, Beg Dara, and Beyg Darreh) is a village in Valdian Rural District, Ivughli District, Khoy County, West Azerbaijan Province, Iran. At the 2006 census, its population was 828, in 195 families.

References 

Populated places in Khoy County